The 556th Test and Evaluation Squadron is a United States Air Force unit.  It is assigned to the 53d Test and Evaluation Group at Creech Air Force Base, Nevada, and conducts unmanned aircraft testing.

Mission
The 556th Test and Evaluation Squadron is the Air Force's first operational test squadron for unmanned aircraft.  It provides support to UAS operations worldwide, through force development evaluations, the development of training, tactics and procedures, systems expertise and meeting warfighters' urgent need requests.

History
The 556th designation was reactivated by Air Combat Command for its current mission due to its lineage and long history of surveillance and intelligence-gathering.

World War II
The squadron was constituted on 9 June 1942 as the 15th Photographic Mapping Squadron and activated on 20 June at Colorado Springs Army Air Base. Components of the squadron deployed to England for combat training by the Royal Air Force, while the remainder of squadron received aircraft and ground training in Oklahoma.

Deployed to Algeria in early December 1942 as part of Operation Torch invasion forces, the squadron became the main source of aerial intelligence for Twelfth Air Force in the North African Campaign. It supported United States Fifth Army in its drive across Algeria and during the Tunisian Campaign during 1942 and 1943.  The 15th flew air reconnaissance and mapping missions over Sicily and Southern Italy prior to Allied invasions during 1943. On 6 February 1943, it was redesignated as the 15th Photographic Squadron (Heavy).

It was reassigned to Fifteenth Air Force in December 1943, flying numerous long distance reconnaissance flights over the Balkans, Occupied Europe and Germany, photographing targets for later attack by Fifteenth Air Force and Twelfth Air Force bombers.  The squadron obtained intelligence about enemy fortifications, armored units, infantry concentrations and other tactical intelligence. These flights were extremely hazardous, being flown without escort and in unarmed aircraft. On 21 January 1944 it became a combat mapping squadron with the same number, but was again renamed the 15th Photographic Reconnaissance Squadron on 31 August. After the surrender of Germany, the unit gradually demobilized and was inactivated in Italy on 28 October 1945.

Postwar 
On 29 April 1947, the squadron became the 15th Reconnaissance Squadron (Photographic), and was reactivated on 19 May 1947 at Langley Field with the 67th Reconnaissance Group of Tactical Air Command, operating the F-6 Mustang, a photo reconnaissance variant of the famed P-51 Mustang fighter. After transferring to the 10th Reconnaissance Group on 24 July, it moved to Lawson Field on 8 September and to Pope Field on 1 October. Due to funding and manpower shortages, the squadron was inactivated on 3 December, and its equipment and personnel were merged into the senior 15th Tactical Reconnaissance Squadron.

556th Reconnaissance Squadron
In 1968 the unit was reorganized as the 556th Reconnaissance Squadron, being formed from the equipment and personnel of the :: Assuming personnel and equipment of 6091st Reconnaissance Squadron and placed under the PACAF 347th Tactical Fighter Wing at Yokota Air Base, Japan.  The squadron, however operated in a deployed status from Bien Hoa Air Base, South Vietnam.

All the drones were carried and started from specially modified GC-130As, MC-130AS and – finally – DC-130A and DC-130E control aircraft, each equipped with systems for carriage, start, control and guidance of drones. The drones were always pre-programmed, but after release their progress was monitored and the drone controller could override the programme manually if necessary. The carrier aircraft had a console for two controller pilots equipped with all the usual flight instruments, which read the data sent to them from the drone. All data about the navigation, planned route, actual flight pad and position of the drone, and the carrier aircraft were fed into a single system which showed them on one display. On their return the drones deployed a parachute and were snared by specially modified CH-3E recovery helicopters.

From 1969, first serious encounters with North Vietnamese MiG-17 and MiG-21 interceptors followed. In 1969 alone, North Vietnamese fighters – primarily MiG-21s – were scrambled no less than 540 times in order to intercept drones, claiming to have shot down ten AQM-34s. NVAF MiGs did score 6 kills, and some were scored indirectly by Americans. In May 1970, an AQM-34L photo reconnaissance drone was on a mission over Hanoi area, acting as a manned reconnaissance aircraft. Finishing its photo run, the drone turned toward the Tonkin Gulf where it was to ditch after expending its fuel. Almost everything was going according to plan, down to one detail: the drone was intercepted by an MiG-21. The fighter closed and tried to shoot it down by two K-13/AA-2 Atoll air-to-air missiles. Both malfunctioned however, and the Vietnamese continued the pursuit, trying to down the drone by tackling its wing. By doing so, the NVAF pilot forgot to control his fuel reserves: after the drone fell harmlessly into the sea, his aircraft ran out of fuel. The NVAF pilot ejected while flying back toward the coast. This was the first air-to-air kill scored by an unmanned aircraft in the history of air warfare.

In addition to the drone operations, the squadron received significant amounts of intelligence operating an RB-57F Canberra from Yokota, detached from the MAC 9th Weather Reconnaissance Wing at McClellan Air Force Base, California.  The RB-57 provided very high altitude intelligence with regards to SA-2 locations for mission planning with the AQM-34 low altitude reconnaissance drones.

As part of the drawdown of United States forces from South Vietnam the 556th was officially moved to Yokota Air Base, Japan in 1971, although limited operations continued from Bien Hoa until 30 Jun 1972 when the squadron was inactivated.

Unmanned aircraft test squadron 
The 556th was redesignated as a test and evaluation squadron on 16 January 2008, and reactivated on 15 February with 53d Test and Evaluation Group at Creech Air Force Base, Nevada, under the command of Lieutenant Colonel Ty Moyers. The squadron was formed using the personnel and equipment of the inactivated Detachment 4 of the 53d Group, and was the first USAF Unmanned aircraft systems (UAS) operational test squadron. It was to support UAS operations by providing force development evaluations and developing training, tactics, and procedures for the unmanned aircraft. The 556th received three new General Atomics MQ-1 Predator drones upon activation and was scheduled to receive another MQ-1 by the end of the year and four General Atomics MQ-9 Reaper drones beginning in 2010.

Lineage
 15th Reconnaissance Squadron
 Constituted as the 15th Photographic Mapping Squadron on 9 June 1942
 Activated on 20 June 1942
 Redesignated: 15th Photographic Squadron (Heavy) on 6 February 1943
 Redesignated: 15th Combat Mapping Squadron on 21 January 1944
 Redesignated: 15th Photographic Reconnaissance Squadron on 31 August 1944
 Inactivated on 28 October 1945
 Redesignated 15th Reconnaissance Squadron (Photographic) on 29 April 1947
 Activated on 19 May 1947
 Inactivated on 3 December 1947
 Disbanded on 8 October 1948
 Consolidated with the 556th Reconnaissance Squadron on 19 September 1985

 556th Test and Evaluation Squadron
 Constituted as the 556th Reconnaissance Squadron and activated on 15 May 1968 (not organized)
 Organized on 1 July 1968
 Inactivated on 30 June 1972
 Consolidated with the 15th Reconnaissance Squadron on 19 September 1985
 Consolidated unit designated 556th Tactical Intelligence Squadron but remained inactive
 Redesignated 556th Test and Evaluation Squadron on 16 January 2008
 Activated on 15 February 2008.

Assignments
 3d Photographic Group (later 3d Photographic Reconnaissance and Mapping Group, 3d Photographic Group), 20 June 1942
 Attached to 5th Photographic Group from 21 November 1943
 5th Photographic (later Reconnaissance) Group, 21 January 1944 – 28 October 1945
 67th Reconnaissance Group, 19 May 1947
 10th Reconnaissance Group, 24 July – 3 December 1947
 347th Tactical Fighter Wing, 1 July 1968
 6100st Air Base Wing, 15 May 1971
 475th Air Base Wing, 1 November 1971 – 30 June 1972
 53d Test and Evaluation Group, 15 February 2008 – present

Stations

 Colorado Springs Army Air Base, Colorado, 20 June – 13 August 1942
 RAF Membury (AAF-466), England, 7 September 1942
 RAF Steeple Morden (AAF-122), England, 27 October – 21 November 1942
 Oran Es Sénia Airport, Algeria, 6 December 1942
 A flight of air echelon arrived at Oran Tafraoui Airport, Algeria, 18 November 1942, and moved to Maison Blanche Airport, Algeria, 27 November 1942
 B and C flights of air echelon at Colorado Springs Army Air Base until 12 October 1943 and afterward at Will Rogers Field, Oklahoma, until 21 January 1944
 Maison Blanche Airport, Algeria, 25 December 1942
 Constantine Airfield, Algeria, 5 June 1943
 La Marsa Airfield, Tunisia, 28 June 1943
 Detachment operated from Constantine Airfield, Algeria, until 14 July 1943
 Detachment operated from Grottaglie Airfield, Italy, after 4 October 1943

 Grottaglie Airfield, Italy, November 1943
 Bari Airfield, Italy, 28 December 1943 – October 1945
 Camp Kilmer, New Jersey, 26–28 October 1945
 Langley Field, Virginia, 19 May 1947
 Lawson Field, Georgia, 8 September 1947; 8 September 1947
 Pope Field, North Carolina, 1 October – 3 December 1947.
 Yokota Air BAW, Japan, 1 July 1968 – 30 June 1972
 Continued operations from Bien Hoa Air Base, South Vietnam until 30 October 1971
 Operated from undisclosed locations until 30 June 1972
 Creech Air Force Base, Nevada, 15 February 2008 – present

Aircraft

 B-17 Flying Fortress, 1942–1944
 P-38/F-4 Lightning, 1942–1943
 P-38/F-5 Lightning, 1943–1945
 Potez 540 (Captured from Vichy French Air Force), 1943
 B-25 Mitchell, 1943–1944
 P-51D/F-6D Mustang, 1947.

 C-130B-II Hercules, 1968–1972
 GC-130A, MC-130A, DC-130A and DC-130E Hercules, 1968–1972
 AQM-34, 1968–1972
 RB-57F Canberra, 1968–1972

References

Citations

Bibliography 

 
 
 
 

Test and evaluation squadrons of the United States Air Force